Old Stone Winery is a family-owned winery estate located outside of Salisbury, NC.

Types of wine

The vineyard and winery produces a blend of native, American, and European wines ranging from Chardonnay to Merlot.  Selections of wines are taken from the native muscadine growths of the North Carolina region.

Old Stone's Sweet Muscadine won highest honors in two categories in the commercial division of the 2008 North Carolina State Fair Wine Competition.

References 

Buildings and structures in Rowan County, North Carolina
Wineries in North Carolina
Tourist attractions in Rowan County, North Carolina